Caroline Haddad is a Canadian figure skating coach and former competitive pair skater. With Jean-Sébastien Fecteau, she is the 1992 and 1994 World Junior silver medallist and the 1993 Nebelhorn Trophy champion.

Haddad is currently a coach. She has coached Steza Foo / David Struthers and Cathy Harvey / Jean-Marc Babin.

Competitive highlights
(with Fecteau)

References

Canadian female pair skaters
Living people
World Junior Figure Skating Championships medalists
Year of birth missing (living people)